Lyn Hills is a neighborhood located in Columbus, Georgia. It is located in the northern section of the city.

Columbus metropolitan area, Georgia
Neighborhoods in Columbus, Georgia